Mapela is a large village located northwest of the town of Mokopane in the Waterberg district of the Limpopo province in South Africa.

References

Populated places in the Mogalakwena Local Municipality